The 2014–15 Charlotte Hornets season was the franchise's 25th season in the National Basketball Association (NBA). The team was led by head coach Steve Clifford and assistant coaches Patrick Ewing, Bob Beyer, Stephen Silas, Bob Weiss, and Mark Price.

On May 20, 2014, the team formally changed its name to Charlotte Hornets, and acquired the history and records of the original Charlotte Hornets franchise (1988–2002) from the New Orleans Pelicans.

Preseason

Key dates
 June 26: The 2014 NBA draft took place at the Barclays Center in Brooklyn, New York.
 July 1: 2014 NBA Free Agency begins.

Draft picks

Regular season

Standings

Game log

Preseason
The pre-season schedule was released on July 31.

|- style="background:#fcc;"
| 1
| October 8
| @ Philadelphia
| 
| Gary Neal (14)
| Jefferson & Marvin Williams (8)
| Kemba Walker (3)
| Wells Fargo Center
| 0–1
|- style="background:#cfc;"
| 2
| October 10
| @ Washington
| 
| Gary Neal (19)
| Al Jefferson (10)
| Kemba Walker (6)
| Bon Secours Wellness Arena
| 1–1
|- style="background:#cfc;"
| 3
| October 13
| Orlando
| 
| Al Jefferson (20)
| 3 Tied (7)
| Brian Roberts (6)
| Time Warner Cable Arena
| 2–1
|- style="background:#fcc;"
| 4
| October 15
| Detroit
| 
| Gary Neal (20)
| Jefferson & Kidd-Gilchrist (7)
| Stephenson & Pargo (3)
| Time Warner Cable Arena
| 2–2
|- style="background:#cfc;"
| 5
| October 17
| Washington
| 
| Al Jefferson (20)
| Michael Kidd-Gilchrist (11)
| Marvin Williams (5)
| Verizon Center
| 3–2
|- style="background:#fcc;"
| 6
| October 19
| @ Chicago
| 
| Stephenson & Kidd-Gilchrist (14)
| Marvin Williams (9)
| Kemba Walker (7)
| United Center
| 3–3
|- style="background:#fcc;"
| 7
| October 20
| @ Atlanta
| 
| Gary Neal (21)
| Bismack Biyombo (10)
| Kemba Walker (8)
| Philips Arena
| 3–4
|- style="background:#fcc;"
| 8
| October 23
| Indiana
| 
| Brian Roberts (19)
| Jefferson & Kidd-Gilchrist (7)
| Gary Neal (6)
| Time Warner Cable Arena
| 3–5
|-

Regular season
The schedule was announced on August 13.

|- style="background:#cfc;"
| 1
| October 29
| Milwaukee
| 
| Kemba Walker (26)
| Lance Stephenson (13)
| Lance Stephenson (8)
| Time Warner Cable Arena19,439
| 1–0

|- style="background:#fcc;"
| 2
| November 1
| Memphis
| 
| Al Jefferson (19)
| Michael Kidd-Gilchrist (12)
| Stephenson & Walker (4)
| Time Warner Cable Arena18,133
| 1–1
|- style="background:#fcc;"
| 3
| November 2
| @ New York
| 
| Al Jefferson (21)
| Lance Stephenson (9)
| Lance Stephenson (8)
| Madison Square Garden19,812
| 1–2
|- style="background:#fcc;"
| 4
| November 4
| @ New Orleans
| 
| Gary Neal (21)
| Lance Stephenson (7)
| Brian Roberts (6)
| Smoothie King Center14,840
| 1–3
|- style="background:#cfc;"
| 5
| November 5
| Miami
| 
| Al Jefferson (28)
| Lance Stephenson (13)
| Kemba Walker (7)
| Time Warner Cable Arena15,874
| 2–3
|- style="background:#cfc;"
| 6
| November 7
| Atlanta
| 
| Al Jefferson (34)
| Lance Stephenson (13)
| Kemba Walker (10)
| Time Warner Cable Arena15,891
| 3–3
|- style="background:#fcc"
| 7
| November 9
| @ L.A. Lakers
| 
| Al Jefferson (23)
| Lance Stephenson (10)
| Lance Stephenson (5)
| Staples Center18,997
| 3–4
|- style="background:#fcc"
| 8
| November 11
| @ Portland
| 
| Al Jefferson (22)
| Lance Stephenson (14)
| Neal, Stephenson, Walker, Marvin Williams(3)
| Moda Center18,495
| 3–5
|- style="background:#cfc;"
| 9
| November 14
| @ Phoenix
| 
| Kemba Walker (19)
| Bismack Biyombo (10)
| Lance Stephenson (7)
| Talking Stick Resort Arena16,291
| 4–5
|- style="background:#fcc"
| 10
| November 15
| @ Golden State
| 
| Al Jefferson (19)
| Cody Zeller (10)
| Kemba Walker (5)
| Oracle Arena19,596
| 4–6
|- style="background:#fcc;"
| 11
| November 17
| Dallas
| 
| Gerald Henderson (18)
| Bismack Biyombo (8)
| Lance Stephenson (7)
| Time Warner Cable Arena15,345
| 4–7
|- style="background:#fcc"
| 12
| November 19
| @ Indiana
| 
| Al Jefferson (28)
| Stephenson & Jeffeson (8)
| Stephenson & Walker (7)
| Bankers Life Fieldhouse14,748
| 4–8
|- style="background:#fcc;"
| 13
| November 21
| Orlando
| 
| Al Jefferson (24)
| Kemba Walker (12)
| Kemba Walker (8)
| Time Warner Cable Arena18,126
| 4–9
|- style="background:#fcc"
| 14
| November 23
| @ Miami
| 
| Al Jefferson (22)
| Al Jefferson (12)
| Lance Stephenson (5)
| AmericanAirlines Arena19,639
| 4–10
|- style="background:#fcc;"
| 15
| November 24
| L.A. Clippers
| 
| Cody Zeller (17)
| Jefferson & Biyombo (9)
| Stephensno & Walker (6)
| Time Warner Cable Arena17,180
| 4–11
|- style="background:#fcc;"
| 16
| November 26
| Portland
| 
| Al Jefferson (23)
| Al Jefferson (14)
| Kemba Walker (9)
| Time Warner Cable Arena16,972
| 4–12
|- style="background:#fcc;"
| 17
| November 28
| Golden State
| 
| Brian Roberts (20)
| Cody Zeller (14)
| Kemba Walker (13)
| Time Warner Cable Arena19,381
| 4–13
|- style="background:#fcc;"
| 18
| November 29
| @ Atlanta
| 
| P.J. Hairston (15)
| Bismack Biyombo (11)
| Kemba Walker (6)
| Philips Arena14,185
| 4–14

|- style="background:#fcc;"
| 19
| December 3
| Chicago
| 
| Kemba Walker (23)
| Stephenson & Zeller (7)
| Stephenson & Walker (4)
| Time Warner Cable Arena16,887
| 4–15
|- style="background:#cfc;"
| 20
| December 5
| New York
| 
| Gerald Henderson (22)
| Al Jefferson (13)
| Lance Stephenson (6)
| Time Warner Cable Arena19,102
| 5–15
|- style="background:#cfc;"
| 21
| December 10
| Boston
| 
| Al Jefferson (23)
| Al Jefferson (14)
| Kemba Walker (7)
| Time Warner Cable Arena15,276
| 6–15
|- style="background:#fcc;"
| 22
| December 12
| @ Memphis
| 
| Kemba Walker (28)
| Al Jefferson (9)
| Kemba Walker (7)
| FedExForum15,897
| 6–16
|- style="background:#fcc;"
| 23
| December 13
| Brooklyn
| 
| Michael Kidd-Gilchrist (15)
| Bismack Biyombo (10)
| Kemba Walker (4)
| Time Warner Cable Arena17,113
| 6–17
|- style="background:#fcc;"
| 24
| December 15
| @ Cleveland
| 
| Kemba Walker (24)
| Al Jefferson (8)
| Gary Neal (6)
| Quicken Loans Arena20,562
| 6–18
|- style="background:#fcc;"
| 25
| December 17
| Phoenix
| 
| Al Jefferson (28)
| Al Jefferson (10)
| Kemba Walker (7)
| Time Warner Cable Arena15,459
| 6–19
|- style="background:#cfc;"
| 26
| December 19
| @ Philadelphia
| 
| Kemba Walker (30)
| Al Jefferson (12)
| Gary Neal (6)
| Wells Fargo Center13,398
| 7–19
|- style="background:#cfc;"
| 27
| December 20
| Utah
| 
| Kemba Walker (20)
| Michael Kidd-Gilchrist (11)
| Kemba Walker (6)
| Time Warner Cable Arena17,384
| 8–19
|- style="background:#cfc;"
| 28
| December 22
| Denver
| 
| Al Jefferson (22)
| P.J. Hairston (10)
| Kemba Walker (9)
| Time Warner Cable Arena17,384
| 9–19
|- style="background:#cfc;"
| 29
| December 23
| @ Milwaukee
| 
| Kemba Walker (21)
| Al Jefferson (9)
| Henderson, Roberts, Walker (4)
| BMO Harris Bradley Center14,653
| 10–19
|-style="background:#fcc;"
| 30
| December 26
| @ Oklahoma City
| 
| Brian Roberts (17)
| Biyombo, Henderson, Jefferon (7)
| Gerald Hendeson (5)
|Chesapeake Energy Arena18,203
| 10–20
|-style="background:#fcc;"
| 31
| December 27
| Orlando
| 
| Kemba Walker (42)
| Al Jefferson (9)
| Kemba Walker (7)
| Time Warner Cable Arena19,085
| 10–21
|-style="background:#fcc;"
| 32
| December 29
| Milwaukee
| 
| Kemba Walker (28)
| Marvin Williams (14)
| Jefferson & Henderson (5)
| Time Warner Cable Arena17,430
| 10–22
|-style="background:#fcc;"
| 33
| December 31
| @ Houston
| 
| Kidd-Gilchrist & Henderson (16)
| Michael Kidd-Gilchrist (8)
| Kemba Walker (5)
| Toyota Center18,276
| 10–23

|- style="background:#fcc;"
| 34
| January 2
| Cleveland
| 
| Gerald Henderson (14)
| Henderson (8)
| Kemba Walker (5)
| Time Warner Cable Arena19,307
| 10–24
|- style="background:#cfc; "
| 35
| January 3
| @ Orlando
| 
| Kemba Walker (30)
| Michael Kidd-Gilchrist (12)
| Kemba Walker (6)
| Amway Center15,274
| 11–24
|- style="background:#cfc; "
|36
|January 5
|@ Boston
|
|Kemba Walker (33)
|Bismack Biyombo (10)
|Gerald Henderson (8)
|TD Garden16,720
|12–24
|- style="background:#cfc; "
|37
|January 7
|New Orleans
|
|Kemba Walker (31)
|Michael Kidd-Gilchrist (12)
|Gerald Henderson (6)
|Time Warner Cable Arena15,171
|13–24
|- style="background:#cfc; "
|38
|January 8
|@ Toronto
|
|Gerald Henderson (31)
|Michael Kidd-Gilchrist (12)
|Kemba Walker (8)
|Air Canada Centre19,800
|14–24
|- style="background:#cfc; "
|39
|January 10
|@ New York
|
|Kemba Walker (28)
|Bismack Biyombo (10)
|Brian Roberts (5)
|Madison Square Garden19,812
|15–24
|-  style="background:#fcc;"
|40
|January 14
|San Antonio
|
|Kemba Walker (28)
|Bismack Biyombo (15)
|Cody Zeller (4)
|Time Warner Cable Arena17,309
|15-25
|- style="background:#cfc; "
|41
|January 17
|Indiana
|
|Gerald Henderson (20)
|Michael Kidd-Gilchrist (16)
|Henderson & Roberts(4)
|Time Warner Cable Arena19,285
|16-25
|- style="background:#cfc; "
|42
|January 19
|Minnesota
|
|Gerald Henderson (17)
|Marvin Williams (11)
|Lance Stephenson (9)
|Time Warner Cable Arena17,989
|17-25
|-style="background:#cfc; "
|43
|January 21
|Miami
|
|Kemba Walker (15)
|Michael Kidd-Gilchrist (14)
|Cody Zeller (6)
|Time Warner Cable Arena16,914
|18-25
|- style="background:#fcc;"
|44
|January 23
|@ Cleveland
|
|Al Jefferson (22)
|Al Jefferson (11)
|Lance Stephenson (9)
|Quicken Loans Arena20,562
|18-26
|-style="background:#cfc; "
|45
|January 24
|New York
|
|Brian Roberts (17)
|Cody Zeller (8)
|Lance Stephenson (4)
|Time Warner Cable Arena19,117
|19-26
|- style="background:#fcc;"
|46
|January 28
|@ San Antonio
|
|Gerald Henderson (18)
|Al Jefferson (16)
|Cody Zeller (7)
|AT&T Center18,581
|19-27
|- style="background:#cfc;"
|47
|January 31
|@ Denver
|
|Cody Zeller (21)
|Michael Kidd-Gilchrist (13)
|Lance Stephenson (13)
|Pepsi Center13,302
|20-27

|- style="background:#cfc;"
|48
|February 2
|@ Washington
|
|Jefferson & Roberts (18)
|Michael Kidd-Gilchrist (13)
|Gerald Henderson (18)
|Verizon Center15,816
|21-27
|-style="background:#cfc;"
|49
|February 5
|Washington
|
|Gerald Henderson (27)
|Al Jefferson (10)
|Brian Roberts (5)
|Time Warner Cable Arena17,019
|22-27
|-style="background:#fcc;"
|50
|February 7
|@ Philadelphia
|
|Al Jefferson (18)
|Al Jefferson (9)
|Gerald Henderson (9)
|Wells Fargo Center16,739
|22-28
|-style="background:#fcc;"
|51
|February 8
|Indiana
|
|Al Jefferson (30)
|Al Jefferson (13)
|Gerald Henderson (8)
|Time Warner Cable Arena16,991
|22-29
|-style="background:#fcc;"
|52
|February 10
|Detroit
|
|Gerald Henderson (17)
|Al Jefferson (10)
|Henderson & Roberts (5)
|Time Warner Cable Arena15,876
|22–30
|- align="center"
|colspan="9" bgcolor="#bbcaff"|All-Star Break
|-style="background:#fcc;"
|53
|February 21
|Oklahoma City
|
|Mo Williams (24)
|Al Jefferson (12)
|Mo Williams (12)
|Time Warner Cable Arena19,303
|22-31
|-style="background:#fcc;"
|54
|February 22
|@ Dallas
|
|Mo Williams (22)
|Al Jefferson (17)
|Lance Stephenson (5)
|American Airlines Center20,347
|22-32
|-style="background:#cfc;"
|55
|February 25
|@ Chicago
|
|Michael Kidd-Gilchrist (18)
|Michael Kidd-Gilchrist (12)
|Mo Williams (5)
|United Center21,509
|23-32
|-style="background:#fcc;"
|56
|February 27
|@ Boston
|
|Mo Williams (31)
|Michael Kidd-Gilchrist (11)
|Lance Stephenson (7)
|TD Garden18,624
|23-33
|-

|-style="background:#cfc;"
|57
|March 1
|@ Orlando
|
|Mo Williams (23)
|Michael Kidd-Gilchrist (13)
|Mo Williams (11)
|Amway Center15,422
|24-33
|-style="background:#cfc;"
|58
|March 3
|L.A. Lakers
|
|Henderson & Jefferson (21)
|Al Jefferson (16)
|Mo Williams (13)
|Time Warner Cable Arena16,947
|25-33
|-style="background:#cfc;"
|59
|March 4
|@ Brooklyn
|
|Henderson & Jefferson (19)
|Al Jefferson (13)
|Mo Williams (14)
|Barclays Center16,691
|26-33
|-style="background:#cfc;"
|60
|March 6
|Toronto
|
|Jefferson & Mo Williams (23)
|Al Jefferson (13)
|Mo Williams (7)
|Time Warner Cable Arena19,080
|27-33
|-style="background:#cfc;"
|61
|March 8
|@ Detroit
|
|Al Jefferson (24)
|Al Jefferson (8)
|Henderson & Mo Williams (9)
|The Palace of Auburn Hills15,673
|28-33
|-style="background:#fcc;"
|62
|March 9
|Washington
|
|Mo Williams (19)
|Bismack Biyombo (9)
|Mo Williams (7)
|Time Warner Cable Arena15,119
|28–34
|-style="background:#fcc;"
|63
|March 11
|Sacramento
|
|Michael Kidd-Gilchrist (23)
|Michael Kidd-Gilchrist (9)
|Gerald Henderson (11)
|Time Warner Cable Arena15,885
|28-35
|-style="background:#cfc;"
|64
|March 13
|Chicago
|
|Gerald Henderson (20)
|Bismack Biyombo (10)
|Kemba Walker (7)
|Time Warner Cable Arena19,183
|29–35
|-style="background:#fcc;"
|65
|March 16
|@ Utah
|
|Lance Stephenson (17)
|Al Jefferson (7)
|Walker & Mo Williams (3)
|EnergySolutions Arena16,743
|29–36
|-style="background:#fcc;"
|66
|March 17
|@ L.A. Clippers
|
|Al Jefferson (21)
|Marvin Williams (11)
|Mo Williams (8)
|Staples Center19,060
|29–37
|-style="background:#fcc;"
|67
|March 20
|@ Sacramento
|
|Gerald Henderson (20)
|Henderson & Jefferson & Walker (5)
|Walker & Cody Zeller (4)
|Sleep Train Arena16,799
|29–38
|-style="background:#cfc;"
|68
|March 22
|@ Minnesota
|
|Mo Williams (24)
|Al Jefferson (11)
|Kemba Walker (8)
|Target Center15,262
|30-38
|-style="background:#fcc;"
|69
|March 23
|@ Chicago
|
|Kemba Walker (29)
|Gilchrist & Henderson (9)
|Mo Williams (5)
|United Center21,646
|30-39
|-style="background:#fcc;"
|70
|March 25
|Brooklyn
|
|Henderson & Jefferson (23)
|Gilchrist & Jefferson (10)
|Walker & Mo Williams (6)
|Time Warner Cable Arena15,091
|30–40
|-style="background:#fcc;"
|71
|March 27
|@ Washington
|
|Al Jefferson (31)
|Gerald Henderson (14)
|Walker & Mo Williams (10)
|Verizon Center18,441
|30-41
|-style="background:#cfc;"
|72
|March 28
|Atlanta
|
|Kemba Walker (29)
|Bismack Biyombo (11)
|Kemba Walker (6)
|Time Warner Cable Arena19,122
|31–41
|-style="background:#fcc;"
|73
|March 30
|Boston
|
|Kemba Walker (28)
|Jason Maxiell (8)
|Kemba Walker (120
|Time Warner Cable Arena15,140
|31-42

|-style="background:#cfc;"
|74
|April 1
|Detroit
|
|Marvin Williams (18)
|Al Jefferson (9)
|Mo Williams (6)
|Time Warner Cable Arena15,372
|32–42
|-style="background:#fcc;"
|75
|April 3
|@ Indiana
|
|Gerald Henderson (12)
|Bismack Biyombo (9)
|Marvin Williams (4)
|Bankers Life Fieldhouse18,165
|32–43
|-style="background:#cfc;"
|76
|April 4
|Philadelphia
|
|Kemba Walker (24)
|Bismack Biyombo (9)
|Mo Williams (5)
|Time Warner Cable Arena17,286
|33-43
|-style="background:#fcc;"
|77
|April 7
|@ Miami
|
|Gerald Henderson (29)
|Marvin Williams (13)
|Walker & Mo Williams (4)
|American Airlines Arena19,694
|33-44
|-style="background:#fcc;"
|78
|April 8
|Toronto
|
|Kemba Walker (15)
|Bismack Biyombo (7)
|Henderson, Roberts, Walker & Mo Williams (3)
|Time Warner Cable Arena
|33–45
|-style="background:#fcc;"
|79
|April 10
|@ Atlanta
|
|Troy Daniels (15)
|Bismack Biyombo (11)
|Kemba Walker (6)
|Philips Arena18,462
|33–46
|-style="background:#fcc;"
|80
|April 12
|@ Detroit
|
|Noah Vonleh (16)
|Noah Vonleh (12)
|Kemba Walker (7)
|The Palace of Auburn Hills17,297
|33–47
|-style="background:#fcc;"
|81
|April 13
|Houston
|
|Brian Roberts (23)
|Bismack Biyombo (13)
|Henderson, Walker (5)
|Time Warner Cable Arena15,797
|33–48
|-style="background:#fcc;"
|82
|April 15
|@ Toronto
|
|Troy Daniels (24)
|Noah Vonleh (12)
|Brian Roberts (5)
|Air Canada Centre19,800
|33–49
|-

Player statistics

Summer League

|
|5 || 0 || 11.2 || .400 || .500 || .500 || 3.0 || 0.8 || 0.2 || 0.0 || 2.2
|-
|
|3 || 0 || 13.3 || .143 || .000 || 1.000 || 0.3 || 2.0 || 0.3 || 0.0 || 1.3
|-
|
|4 || 4 || 30.8 || .439 || .545 || .750 || 7.8 || 2.5 || 0.5 || 0.0 || 13.5
|-
|
|5 || 5 || 29.2 || .333 || .294 || .813 || 5.2 || 2.0 || 1.0 || 0.0 || 12.2
|-
|
|5 || 4 || 29.0 || .421 || .238 || .667 || 4.8 || 3.4 || 1.4 || 0.6 || 13.4
|-
|
|5 || 5 || 32.6 || .438 || .389 || .765 || 7.8 || 0.8 || 1.0 || 0.6 || 15.2
|-
|
|5 || 1 || 20.6 || .455 || .333 || .818 || 2.8 || 1.4 || 0.8 || 0.2 || 6.2
|-
|
|5 || 5 || 21.6 || .583 || .000 || .500 || 5.2 || 1.4 || 1.0 || 1.6 || 6.0
|-
|
|3 || 0 || 5.3 || 1.000 || .000 || .000 || 0.7 || 0.0 || 0.3 || 0.3 || 1.3
|-
|
|2 || 0 || 7.5 || .000 || .000 || .000 || 1.0 || 0.0 || 1.0 || 0.5 || 0.0
|-
|
|4 || 1 || 15.2 || .364 || .429 || .000 || 1.0 || 2.0 || 0.2 || 0.2 || 5.5
|-
|}

Preseason

|
|7 || 1 || 17.3 || .326 || .000 || .625 || 5.4 || 0.4 || 0.1 || 1.0 || 3.6
|-
|
|0 || 0 || 0.0 || .000 || .000 || .000 || 0.0 || 0.0 || 0.0 || 0.0 || 0.0
|-
|
|8 || 0 || 19.1 || .391 || .421 || .846 || 2.6 || 0.9 || 0.8 || 0.4 || 9.6
|-
|
|8 || 8 || 27.4 || .371 || .167 || .759 || 1.4 || 1.6 || 0.9 || 0.0 || 11.3
|-
|
|7 || 7 || 28.9 || .396 || .000 || .824 || 7.4 || 1.6 || 0.7 || 1.6 || 14.0
|-
|
|8 || 8 || 29.4 || .429 || .000 || .722 || 6.8 || 2.0 || 1.4 || 1.0 || 10.8
|-
|
|0 || 0 || 0.0 || .000 || .000 || .000 || 0.0 || 0.0 || 0.0 || 0.0 || 0.0
|-
|
|5 || 0 || 14.2 || .429 || .000 || .667 || 3.0 || 0.0 || 0.0 || 1.0 || 4.0
|-
|
|8 || 0 || 26.3 || .402 || .222 || .933 || 3.9 || 3.5 || 0.3 || 0.1 || 12.5
|-
|
|6 || 0 || 15.2 || .426 || .375 || .600 || 1.8 || 2.8 || 0.3 || 0.0 || 9.7
|-
|
|8 || 0 || 23.8 || .397 || .250 || 1.000 || 1.1 || 2.9 || 0.5 || 0.0 || 9.0
|-
|
|4 || 4 || 30.0 || .425 || .286 || .700 || 3.3 || 2.8 || 0.5 || 0.0 || 10.8
|-
|
|1 || 0 || 19.0 || .400 || .000 || .000 || 4.0 || 0.0 || 2.0 || 0.0 || 4.0
|-
|
|6 || 6 || 26.7 || .438 || .318 || .944 || 4.2 || 5.5 || 0.7 || 0.5 || 13.3
|-
|
|7 || 7 || 26.7 || .341 || .269 || .333 || 5.9 || 2.1 || 1.7 || 0.3 || 5.6
|-
|
|8 || 1 || 21.6 || .477 || .000 || .867 || 4.5 || 2.1 || 0.3 || 0.4 || 6.9
|}

Regular season

|
|64 || 21 || 19.4 || .543 || .000 || .580 || 6.4 || 0.3 || 0.3 || 1.5 || 4.8
|-
|
|11 || 0 || 12.3 || .458 || .472 || .860 || 0.7 || 0.5 || 0.3 || 0.1 || 7.0
|-
|
|45 || 2 || 15.3 || .323 || .301 || .860 || 2.0 || 0.5 || 0.5 || 0.3 || 5.6
|-
|
|80 || 72 || 28.9 || .437 || .331 || .850 || 3.4 || 2.6 || 0.6 || 0.3 || 12.1
|-
|
|65 || 61 || 30.6 || .481 || .400 || .650 || 8.4 || 1.7 || 0.7 || 1.3 || 16.6
|-
|
| 55 || 51 || 28.9 || .465 || .000 || .700 || 7.6 || 1.4 || 0.5 || 0.7 || 10.9
|-
|
|61 || 0 || 14.4 || .422 || .000 || .580 || 3.3 || 0.3 || 0.3 || 0.7 || 3.3
|-
|
|43 || 0 || 21.7 || .359 || .293 || 0.860 || 2.2 || 1.9 || 0.4 || 0.0 || 9.6
|-
|
|9 || 0 || 8.1 || .429 || .409 || 1.000 || 0.3 || 0.9 || 0.0 || 0.0 || 4.6
|-
|
|72 || 10 || 18.5 || .389 || .321 || .890 || 1.5 || 2.3 || 0.5 || 0.1 || 6.7
|-
|
|61 || 25 || 25.8 || .376 || .171 || .630 || 4.5 || 3.9 || 0.6 || 0.1 || 8.2
|-
|
|29 || 13 || 14.8 || .395 || .306 || .630 || 1.8 || 0.8 || 0.4 || 0.0 || 4.4
|-
|
|25 || 0 || 10.4 || .395 || .385 || .690 || 3.4 || 0.2 || 0.2 || 0.4 || 3.3
|-
|
|62 || 58 || 34.2 || .385 || .304 || .830 || 3.5 || 5.1 || 1.4 || 0.6 || 17.3
|-
|
|78 || 37 || 26.1 || .424 || .358 || .710 || 4.9 || 1.3 || 0.9 || 0.5 || 7.4
|-
|
|27 ||14 || 30.8 || .390 || .337 || .890 || 2.8 || 6.0 || 0.6 || 0.2 || 17.2
|-
|
|62 || 45 || 24.0 || .461 || 1.000 || .770 || 5.8 || 1.6 || 0.6 || 0.8 || 7.6
|}

Injuries

Roster

Transactions

Trades

Free agents

Re-signed

Additions

Subtractions

Awards

References

External links

 2014–15 Charlotte Hornets preseason at ESPN
 2014–15 Charlotte Hornets regular season at ESPN

Charlotte
Charlotte Hornets seasons
2014 in sports in North Carolina
2015 in sports in North Carolina